Tite et Bérénice is a heroic comedy by the 17th-century French playwright Pierre Corneille.

It was premiered on 28 November 1670 by the troupe of Molière at the Palais Royal Theater in Paris, in the same month as the more famous tragedy on the same theme written by Corneille's rival Jean Racine, Bérénice, which was produced by the Comédiens du Roi at the Hôtel de Bourgogne on 21 November.

It revolves around the situation of the Roman general Titus, who brought Berenice of Cilicia, the sister of Herod Agrippa, back to Rome with him from the sack of Jerusalem in 70 CE. It was understood that she would become his wife, but when he became emperor the following year, he felt forced to renounce her and send her back home. The tragic situation is played out in the competing demands of love and duty.

References

 Hochman, Stanley, editor (1984). McGraw-Hill Encyclopedia of World Drama (second edition, 5 volumes). New York: McGraw-Hill. .

1670 plays
Plays by Pierre Corneille
Roman Empire in art and culture
Cultural depictions of Titus